
Żagań County is a unit of territorial administration and local government (powiat) in Lubusz Voivodeship, western Poland. It came into being on January 1, 1999, as a result of the Polish local government reforms passed in 1998.

As of 2019 its total population is 79,297. The most populated towns are Żagań with 25,731 inhabitants and Szprotawa with 11,820 inhabitants.

Neighbouring counties
Żagań County is bordered by Zielona Góra County to the north, Nowa Sól County to the north-east, Głogów County and Polkowice County to the east, Bolesławiec County and Zgorzelec County to the south, and Żary County to the west.

Administrative division
The county is subdivided into nine gminas (two urban, three urban-rural and four rural). These are listed in the following table, in descending order of population.

References

 
Land counties of Lubusz Voivodeship